Shadows in the Light is a seventh full-length album by American death metal band Immolation. It was released on May 8, 2007 through Listenable Records.

Track listing

Personnel
Immolation
 Ross Dolan – bass, vocals
 Robert Vigna – guitars
 Bill Taylor – guitars
 Steve Shalaty – drums

Production
 Paul Orofino – Engineering, Mastering, Producer
 Sven de Caluwé – Artwork

References

2007 albums
Immolation (band) albums
Listenable Records albums